The Fab Faux is a musical tribute band performing the works of the Beatles (whose members were often known as the "Fab Four"). The group was founded by Will Lee, bassist for Late Show with David Letterman, and features Jimmy Vivino, bandleader for Conan. Other members include Rich Pagano, Frank Agnello, and Jack Petruzzelli. The band is committed to performing live what they feel would be an accurate reproduction of The Beatles' repertoire, often performing material The Beatles never played live. The band members do not try to impersonate the members of The Beatles, instead simply playing cover songs. The band is often accompanied by a horn section (known as the Hogshead Horns) and a string section (known as the Creme Tangerine Strings) to achieve the proper sound.

Their performances in the New York City area have included The Bowery Ballroom, Webster Hall, Nokia Theater, Irving Plaza, the Beacon Theatre, The Bottom Line, and The China Club. Their shows often have themes; one show could feature a track-by-track rendering of The White Album; the next might feature all of the Beatles' psychedelic work; another will include a full survey of the band from its Cavern Club days through to Let It Be. The Fab Faux has also performed a show of post-Beatle solo material.

The group was featured in a full-length profile on CNN that was broadcast worldwide. They also participated in a CD of original material by Beatles tribute bands, recorded in London at Abbey Road Studios and engineered and produced by Will Schillinger. The group has performed multiple times in Liverpool, England, where they played three shows each year from 1999 to 2005 for that city's annual "Beatle Week" festivities, including outdoor concerts for over 35,000 people on the Yellow Submarine and Let It Be stages.

The band was featured in a full-page story in the August 11, 2005, issue of Rolling Stone magazine (page 22). Senior editor David Fricke wrote: "The Faux invigorate the artistry of even the Beatles' most intricate studio masterpieces with top chops and Beatlemaniac glee;" and the story's byline called The Fab Faux "The greatest Beatles cover band...without the wigs."

In an on-air interview (and accompanying print article) with National Public Radio's Ashley Kahn in January 2008, members of the band discussed their process of re-creating The Beatles' material for live performance; as well as an account of a brief conversation about the band between Will Lee and Paul McCartney.

Notable appearances

On February 9, 2007, the band appeared on the Late Show with David Letterman (43 years to the day, and in the very same studio, that the Beatles first appeared on the Ed Sullivan Show), marking a late-night televised cross-over of sorts, as band member Jimmy Vivino was a featured player in the Max Weinberg 7, which is the house band for Late Night with Conan O'Brien. It was also the first time a tribute band was shown on The Late Show and the second act for which members of the CBS Orchestra, Will Lee and Tom Malone, performed as members of a guest band (Paul Shaffer had performed as part of Earl Scruggs and Steve Martin's bluegrass supergroup during that group's 2001 and 2005 appearances on the show).

On March 28, 2007, the band performed on The Howard Stern Show for the second time. They performed "Sgt. Pepper's Lonely Hearts Club Band (Reprise)/A Day in the Life" from Sgt. Pepper's Lonely Hearts Club Band, "Penny Lane" and "While My Guitar Gently Weeps." Stern stated during a replay of their performances that listening to them gives him chills.

On May 8, 2008, at Madison Square Garden, the band appeared with vocalist Joan Osborne and Phish guitarist Trey Anastasio as featured performers, celebrating the 7th Annual Jammy Awards.

On September 12, 2008, the band appeared on Late Night with Conan O'Brien, once again marking a "cross-over." On September 20, 2008, the band celebrated its 10th anniversary at a sold-out show in Radio City Music Hall.

Band members

Current members
Will Lee - bass, keys, vocals
Jimmy Vivino - guitar, keys, vocals
Rich Pagano - drums, vocals
Frank Agnello - guitar, vocals
Jack Petruzzelli - keys, guitar, vocals

Guest musicians
Jerry Vivino - horns
Tom "Bones" Malone - horns
Tom Timko - horns
Lew Soloff - trumpet
Sibel Finn - cello
Amy Kimball - violin
Erin Hill - harp, backing vox
Andy York - guitar, backing vox
John Chudoba - trumpet
Jim Boggia - guitar
Denny Laine - guitar, backing vox
Glen Burtnik - guitar, backing vox

Notes

External links
 The Fab Faux - Official website
2012 Audio Interview with Rich Pagano from Podcast "I'd Hit That

The Beatles tribute bands
Musical groups from New York City